The 27th Directors Guild of America Awards, honoring the outstanding directorial achievements in film and television in 1974, were presented in 1975.

Winners and nominees

Film

Television

Outstanding Television Director
 John Korty

Honorary Life Member
 Lew Wasserman

External links
 

Directors Guild of America Awards
1974 film awards
1974 television awards
Direct
Direct
Directors